The Spring and Autumn Annals of the Ten Kingdoms, also known by its Chinese title Shiguo Chunqiu, is a history of the Ten Kingdoms that existed in southern China after the fall of the Tang Dynasty and before the reunification of China by the Song Dynasty.  The book was written and compiled by the Qing Dynasty scholar Wu Renchen ( 1628 –  1689).  Wu took part in the compilation of Mingshi, the official history of the Ming Dynasty, and felt that the official dynastic histories have neglected the Ten Kingdoms.  The book contains 114 volumes (scrolls).

Contents 
The book consists of 114 volumes covering the histories of the Ten Kingdoms:

14 volumes - Wu (907–937)
20 volumes - Southern Tang (937–975)
13 volumes - Former Shu (907–925)
10 volumes - Later Shu (934–965)
9 volumes - Southern Han (917–971)
10 volumes - Chu (907–951)
13 volumes - Wuyue (907–978)
10 volumes - Min (909–945)
4 volumes - Jingnan (924–963)
5 volumes - Northern Han (951–979)

References

External links
《摛藻堂四庫全書薈要》本《十國春秋》 (Library) - Chinese Text Project

Chinese history texts
17th-century history books
Qing dynasty literature
History books about the Five Dynasties and Ten Kingdoms